Grahovše is a settlement in the Municipality of Tržič in the Upper Carniola region of Slovenia.

Name
The name Grahovše is believed to derive from the earlier form *Grahovišče, which as a common noun refers to a place where peas are grown.

References

External links 
Grahovše at Geopedia

Populated places in the Municipality of Tržič